Keepsakes - A Collection is an anthology by All About Eve released on 13 March 2006. It is available either as a double CD or as a limited edition double CD and DVD set (the DVD containing the band's videos and television performances).

Unlike Winter Words, this compilation had the support and involvement of the band. Lead singer Julianne Regan said of it "Compiling the album reminded me that we were actually a pretty good band about 70% of the time."

Track listing
First CD:
Flowers in Our Hair (extended version)
In the Clouds
Calling Your Name
Paradise (1989 remix)
Martha's Harbour
Every Angel (7" remix)
What Kind of Fool (Autumn Rhapsody)
Wild Flowers (1988 BBC session version)
Candy Tree (Live at the Hammersmith Odeon 1988)
Wild Hearted Woman (Live at the Hammersmith Odeon 1988)
Our Summer (Live)
In the Meadow (Live at the Hammersmith Odeon 1988)
Gold and Silver
Scarlet
Road to Your Soul
Drowning
December
What Kind of Fool 2006
The Empty Dancehall - Revisited

Second CD:
Farewell Mr Sorrow
Strange Way
Rhythm of Life
Wishing the Hours Away
The Dreamer (Tim Palmer Mix)
Touched by Jesus
Are You Lonely
See Emily Play (Demo Version)
Phased
Freeze
I Don't Know (Alternate Version)
Some Finer Day
Infrared
Outshine the Sun
Let Me Go Home
Keepsakes
Raindrops

DVD (only available on limited edition version):
Flowers in Our Hair (video)
In the Clouds (video)
Wild Hearted Woman (video)
Every Angel (video)
Martha's Harbour (video)
What Kind of Fool (video)
Road to Your Soul (video)
December (video)
Scarlet (video)
Farewell Mr Sorrow (video)
Strange Way (video)
The Dreamer (video)
Phased (video)
Some Finer Day (video)
Let Me Go Home (video)
Every Angel (performed for Going Live! in 1988)
Martha's Harbour (performed (live) for Top of the Pops in 1988)
What Kind of Fool (performed for Top of the Pops in 1988)
Scarlet (performed for Daytime Live in 1990)
More Than the Blues (performed for Daytime Live in 1990)
Farewell Mr Sorrow (performed for Top of the Pops in 1991)

The DVD also features two Easter Eggs:
Martha's Harbour (performed (mimed) for Top of the Pops in 1988 - the "infamous" version [see notes])
What Kind of Fool (an alternate version of the video deemed suitable for children as it does not feature tarot cards)

Notes
Despite this compilation being in the greatest hits vein, it does feature a large number of songs which have not appeared in any previously recorded format (including all of the live and demo tracks).

The compilation also contains four completely new or re-worked songs which are "What Kind of Fool 2006", "The Empty Dancehall Revisited", "Keepsakes" (which has also been released as a download single) and "Raindrops".

The sleeve-notes to this compilation are a no-holds barred history of the band which detail the failures and the mistakes as well as the triumphs.

The "infamous" version of "Martha's Harbour" was a Top of the Pops performance featuring just Julianne Regan and Tim Bricheno which - as was usual BBC policy at the time - was mimed.  Unfortunately the backing tape wasn't played to the performers and which meant that they couldn't hear what they were supposed to be miming to - whereas the TV audience could hear the song with the two of them just sitting there. They pick the song up to much studio audience applause mid-way through the second verse, when someone realised the mistake.

"The Empty Dancehall Revisited" and "Raindrops" feature Bricheno playing on an All About Eve album for the first time since their second album Scarlet and Other Stories seventeen years beforehand.

Marty Willson-Piper wasn't available for the Top of the Pops performance of "Farewell Mr Sorrow" so his part in the mime was taken by a roadie called Adam Birch.

All About Eve (band) compilation albums
2006 compilation albums
2006 video albums
Music video compilation albums
Mercury Records compilation albums
Mercury Records video albums